Claudine Françoise Mignot (20 January 1624 – 30 November 1711) was a French adventuress born near Grenoble, at Meylan. She was commonly called "Marie".

Biography 
At the age of sixteen, she attracted the notice of the secretary Pierre de Portes d'Amblérieu, treasurer of the province of Dauphiné, and Pierre promised to promote their marriage. Instead, he married her himself on 29 July 1640 and left her his fortune. Immediately on her marriage with Pierre she had begun to educate herself, and her wealth and talents assured her a welcome in Paris.

His will was disputed by his family, and Claudine went to Paris in 1653 to secure its fulfilment. He married her on 25 August 1653, within a week of their first meeting, and after seven years of marriage died on 20 April 1660, leaving her part of his estate.They had one son (c. 1654 – c. 1657).

By a third and morganatic marriage on 14 September 1672 with John Casimir, former king of Poland. A few weeks before his sudden death, she received a third enormous fortune. In the testament, written on 12 December 1672 in Nevers, John Casimir called himself her debtor. They had one daughter named Marie Catherine, to whom her father left fifteen thousand livres, and asked her to join the Order of the Visitation of Holy Mary.

She retired in her old age to a Carmelite convent, where she died on 30 November 1711. Her history was the subject of a play by Bayard and Paul Duport: Marie Mignot (1829).

References

 

1617 births
1711 deaths
Mingnot, Claudine
People from Grenoble
Morganatic spouses